Alexandre Briancon (born 9 February 1991) is a French figure skater. He is a two-season competitor on the Junior Grand Prix and placed 9th at the 2007 French Figure Skating Championships. He won the bronze medal at the 2007 European Youth Olympics.

External links
 

French male single skaters
Living people
1991 births
Sportspeople from Annecy